Muhammad Noor Meskanzai (Urdu: محمد نور مسکانزئی; 1September 1956 – 14 October 2022) was a Pakistani judge who served as the 17th Chief Justice of the Federal Shariat Court. Prior to his appointment as chief justice of the Islamic Court on 15 May 2021, he served as the 18th chief justice of Balochistan High Court from 26 December 2014 to 31 August 2018. He was assassinated by an outlawed insurgent group in his hometown. His killer was arrested 2 weeks after his assassination and is now under investigation of ISI, so the facilitators of murder and other suspects could also be arrested in the case.

The president of Pakistan appointed him as the chief justice of Shariat Court for the term of one year three days before his retirement from the legal services. He was critically injured on 14 October 2022 when he was shot outside a mosque in Kharan, Pakistan. Later he died at a nearby hospital.

Earlier life 
Meskanzai was born in Kharan, Pakistan to Dr. Molvi Muhammad Qasim Aini Baloch. He did his early schooling from the Government Middle School (in modern-day High School), Kunri. The school was founded by his father and was the first private educational institution in the area. It was later recognised by the Education Commission of Pakistan between 1951 and 1952. He did his matriculation from the same school and later went to Quetta. He obtained his F.A. from the Government Degree College, Quetta and B.A., and B.Ed. from the University of Balochistan. He obtained his Bachelor of Laws from the University Law College, Quetta in 1979–1980.

Career 
Meskanzai started his legal practice in September 1981 and was subsequently appointed a legal advisor to Customs for Makran Division, and Makran Scout at Turbat. He also served as a member of the Panel of Legal Advisors to PTCL Makran Division. Justice Meskanzai was appointed assistant advocate general for Balochistan, Pakistan where he remained in the office from June to December, 1998. He was then elected as vice chairman of the Balochistan Bar Council from the 24 March 2005 to 24 March 2006.

Meskanzai was invited by International Lawyers Club United Kingdom to London as a chief guest in 2019. He remained a member of various judicial organizations such as the National Judicial Policy Making Committee, Law and Justice Commission of Pakistan, Advisory Board of Al Mizan Foundation, Council of Trustees & Selection Board of the International Islamic University Islamabad, Administration Committee of Al-Mizan Foundation, Board of Governors, and Board of Trustees.

In April 2022, he authored the landmark judgment that declared the riba-based (interest-based) banking system against the application of Sharia in Pakistan.

Personal life and death 
Meskanzai was fatally shot outside a mosque in Balochistan's Kharan area, on 14 October 2022. Kharan's Superintendent of Police Asif Halim told Dawn News that unidentified assailants opened fire at him outside the mosque, which left Maskanzai gravely injured. He was taken to a nearby hospital, where he died of his injuries.

According to the Voice of America Urdu, the Balochistan Liberation Army accepted responsibility for his killing, calling him a 'high profile target.'

References 

1956 births
2022 deaths
Chief Justices of the Balochistan High Court
Chief justices of the Federal Shariat Court
University of Balochistan alumni
Baloch people
Assassinated judges
Assassinated Pakistani people
Deaths by firearm in Pakistan
People murdered in Pakistan